The 2003 Four Nations Tournament was the third edition of this invitational women's football tournament held in China with four national teams participating in a round robin format. It was held from January 23 to 29, 2003, in the cities of Yiwu, Wuhan and Shanghai.

Final standings

Match results

Goalscorers

References

2003 in women's association football
2003
2003 in Chinese football
2003 in American women's soccer
2003 in Norwegian women's football
2002–03 in German women's football
2003 in Chinese women's sport
January 2004 sports events in Asia